Fries Boarding Houses are two historic boarding houses located at Fries, Grayson County, Virginia.  They were built as twins, and are large two-story frame buildings resting on full-height stuccoed brick basements in the Colonial Revival style.  They have side-gable roofs, brick interior end chimneys, and gabled dormers.  The exact date of the boarding houses is unknown, but they likely date to the first phase of village construction between 1901 and 1910.

They were listed on the National Register of Historic Places in 2007.

References

Houses on the National Register of Historic Places in Virginia
Colonial Revival architecture in Virginia
Houses completed in 1910
Houses in Grayson County, Virginia
National Register of Historic Places in Grayson County, Virginia